Kim Moo-Jeon (born May 6, 1982) is a South Korean businessman. He was born in Seoul Government in 1982, studied in China in 1995, and graduated from Liaoning University of Traditional Chinese Medicine in 2004. In June 2016 he provided and operated Korean Internet broadcasting contents on the platform of Xiaomi Broadcasting Company in China, working with Xiaomi E&M for its app Xiaomi Zwo, and provided a variety of close beta services.
 In 2019, A New Model for Economic Cooperation in Silicon Valley He currently serves as CEO of CK.Holding, CEO of KOREAMCN and Vice President of M.O.K Group, chairman of the Medical Industry Association of Korea and head of the Korean Beauty & Plastic industries Association.

Career and award
 CEO of CKDOT GROUP
 CEO of KOREAMCN
 Vice President of M.O.K Group
 Director of Korean Healthcare Consulting
 Representative Director of the Korean Beauty Painting Industry Association
 Director of the Korea-China Cultural Content Exchange Council
 Medical Industry Committee Chairman of the Korea-China International Trade Association
 The 7th Global Donation Culture and Culture Contributions Awards 2016 
 2016 Global Proud Korean Award

References

External links 
 조선일보
 연합뉴스
 조인스닷컴
 NAVER 
 DAUM 

Living people
South Korean businesspeople
People from Seoul
1982 births